Hunger is a 1966 black-and-white drama film directed by Denmark's Henning Carlsen, starring Swedish actor Per Oscarsson, and based upon the novel Hunger by Norwegian Nobel Prize-winning author Knut Hamsun. Filmed on location in Oslo, it was the first film produced as a cooperative effort among the three Scandinavian countries.

With its stark focus on a life of poverty and desperation, the film is considered a masterpiece of social realism. Film historians suggest it was the first Danish film to gain serious international attention since the work of Carl Theodor Dreyer. It is one of the ten films listed in Denmark's cultural canon by the Danish Ministry of Culture.

Plot 
In 1890 Kristiania (Oslo), an impoverished and lonely writer named Pontus (Per Oscarsson) comes to the city from the country. He stands on a bridge, overlooking running water, writing but clearly starving. He visits a pawnbroker several times. He sells his waistcoat for a few cents, then gives the money to a beggar. Other money that falls into his hands he also gives away. He has written an article that a newspaper editor (Henki Kolstad) agrees to publish if he makes some corrections, but Pontus is too proud to accept an advance when offered, so he leaves elated but still hungry. He begs a bone for his fictitious dog, which he gnaws on secretly in an alley. He often has the chance to make things better for himself, but his pride gets in the way, such as when he declines the much-needed help of a worried friend.

When he is unable to pay his rent, the landlady (Else Heiberg) evicts him. Another landlady shortly does the same. Hunger is constantly overwhelming Pontus and he drifts between hallucination and reality while struggling to survive. He suffers humiliations which lead him to the edge of insanity. He applies for an accounting job but is rejected, and fails a physical exam to be a fireman because he wears glasses. One hallucination revolves around Ylajali (Gunnel Lindblom), an apparently refined woman he has met on the street. Despite their mutual flirtations, nothing ever evolves between them. On a sudden impulse, Pontus takes a job as a crew member on an outbound freighter. His destination is unknown.

Cast 

 Per Oscarsson  ... Pontus
 Gunnel Lindblom ... Ylajali
 Birgitte Federspiel ... Her sister
 Knud Rex ... Landlord
 Hans W. Petersen ... Grocer
 Henki Kolstad ... Editor
 Roy Bjørnstad ... Konstantin
 Sverre Hansen ... Painter
 Pål Skjønberg ... Constable
 Else Heiberg ... Landlady
 Lise Fjeldstad ... Little girl
 Carl Ottosen ... Sailor
 Osvald Helmuth  ...  Pawnbroker
 Sigrid Horne-Rasmussen ... Landlady

Awards 
The film was nominated for the Palme D'Or and won the Bodil Award for Best Danish Film in 1967. For his leading role, Oscarsson won Best Actor awards at the 1966 Cannes Film Festival, the Best Actor award at the 4th Guldbagge Awards, 1967 Bodil Awards and the USA's National Society of Film Critics award for Best Actor in 1968. The film was also selected as the Danish entry for the Best Foreign Language Film at the 39th Academy Awards, but was not accepted as a nominee.

See also 

 List of submissions to the 39th Academy Awards for Best Foreign Language Film
 List of Danish submissions for the Academy Award for Best Foreign Language Film

References

Sources

External links 
 
 
 Det Danske Filminstitut

1966 drama films
1966 films
Best Danish Film Bodil Award winners
Danish black-and-white films
Danish Culture Canon
Danish drama films
1960s Danish-language films
Films based on Norwegian novels
Films based on works by Knut Hamsun
Films directed by Henning Carlsen
Films scored by Krzysztof Komeda
Films set in Norway
Films set in the 1890s
Norwegian black-and-white films
1960s Norwegian-language films
Swedish black-and-white films
1960s multilingual films
Danish multilingual films
Norwegian multilingual films
Swedish multilingual films